The Halifax Shipyard Limited is a Canadian shipbuilding company located in Halifax, Nova Scotia.

Founded in 1889, it is today a wholly owned subsidiary of Irving Shipbuilding Inc. and is that company's largest ship construction and repair facility.

History

Halifax Graving Dock Company 1889–1918

The Halifax Graving Dock Company was formed by English investors who constructed the graving dock for $1 million, opening on September 21, 1889 on the western shore of Halifax Harbour in the community of Richmond.  The following year on August 22, 1890 the Halifax Graving Dock Company purchased the  Chebucto Marine Railway Company Limited located in Dartmouth Cove, at the mouth of the former Shubenacadie Canal in Dartmouth. The yard built a small steam tug for its own use in 1915, the tug Sambro. 

Many yard workers were killed and Sambro was sunk. The graving dock was quickly repaired and planning began to add building slips and plating shops for a modern ship yard to construct the first steel-hulled ships in Atlantic Canada. Sambro was raised and renamed .

Halifax Shipyards Limited 1918–1978

In 1918 the Halifax Graving Dock Company's assets were purchased by Montreal investors who organized them into the Halifax Shipyards Limited, completing the shipyard and beginning ship construction in the final stages of World War I. In 1920 Halifax Shipyards Limited was acquired by the conglomerate British Empire Steel Corporation (BESCO). In 1930 Halifax Shipyards Limited was acquired by the conglomerate Dominion Steel and Coal Corporation (DOSCO).  During World War II, the company's facilities were critical to the war effort as Halifax Shipyards Limited constructed four s for the Royal Canadian Navy – the first all-Canadian built destroyers – and was vital in repairing more than 7,200 ships damaged in the Battle of the Atlantic.

From the early 1950s to the mid-1960s the shipyard won contracts with the Royal Canadian Navy to construct four destroyers as part of the RCN's post-war fleet modernization program. In 1957 Halifax Shipyards Limited was acquired by the conglomerate A.V. Roe Canada Ltd., which had purchased DOSCO and its subsidiary companies. In 1962 Halifax Shipyards Limited was acquired by the conglomerate Hawker Siddeley Canada which had purchased A.V. Roe Canada Ltd. and its subsidiary companies.

Under Hawker Siddeley ownership, the company began to diversify its contracts in the 1960s and 1970s, constructing ferries and other government contracts, as well as oil drilling rigs and drill ships for Atlantic Canada's nascent offshore oil and gas industry.  Various repairs and smaller builds filled out the order sheet during this period.

Halifax Industries Limited 1978–1985
In 1978 the parent company Hawker Siddeley was placed in receivership and the shipyard's assets were held by the primary creditor, the Government of Nova Scotia.  A consortium named Halifax Industries Limited was organized and reached an agreement with the provincial government to operate the shipyard.  A modernization program began in 1979 with a $7.5 million mill upgrading as well as a replacement program for yard infrastructure.  The floating dry dock Prins Hendrik Dok No. 4 (RDM-173), built in Rotterdam in 1933 (by and for NV De Rotterdamsche Droogdok Maatschappij) was purchased and rebuilt by the shipyard in 1979.  It was renamed Scotiadock and complemented the existing graving dock for ship repair and construction.  In 1983 a new Panamax floating dry dock was purchased, having been built in 1982 by Marine Industries Limited in Sorel, Quebec.  It was named Novadock and gave the shipyard the ability to repair the largest-sized ships on the eastern seaboard.

Halifax-Dartmouth Industries Limited 1985–1994
In 1985 the shipyard declared bankruptcy and was purchased by a group of Nova Scotia investors who organized it as Halifax-Dartmouth Industries Limited (HDIL). SNC-Lavalin sub-contracted HDIL for the ship design and construction of the twelve vessels.

Halifax Shipyard Limited 1994 – Present

In 1994, midway through the MCDV project, the shipyard's owners sold HDIL to Irving Shipbuilding Inc. of Saint John, New Brunswick who renamed the yard Halifax Shipyard Limited.  In 1998, the shipyard purchased a replacement floating dry dock for the Scotiadock.  The floating dry dock General Georges P Vanier was built by Canadian Vickers Ltd. in 1964.  Upon purchase by Irving Shipbuilding, the dry dock was renamed Scotia Dock II. The original dry dock was later scrapped. 

Like all Canadian shipyards, Halifax Shipyard Limited underwent a dramatic slowdown in new construction and refit business during the late 1990s and throughout the 2000s due to changes in Government of Canada tax and tariff policies for ship owners, as well as a reduction in federal government construction for warships, icebreakers, ferries and scientific vessels.  On June 27, 2003 Irving Shipbuilding announced it had an agreement with the federal government to permanently close the country's largest shipyard, Saint John Shipbuilding in Saint John.  The competing Davie Yards Incorporated in Lauzon, Quebec experienced similar financial difficulty and spent much of the decade in mothball status.  This left Halifax Shipyard Limited as the largest full-service shipyard left on Canada's Atlantic coast and the flagship facility for Irving Shipbuilding Inc.

A handful of new-build contracts for oil rig supply vessels, a cruise ship, as well as repair and maintenance contracts for Royal Canadian Navy warships and Canadian Coast Guard icebreakers and scientific vessels, public and privately owned ferries, commercial ships, and oil rigs has kept Halifax Shipyard Limited moderately busy in recent years.

In September 2009 Irving Shipbuilding was awarded a contract to build the  project for the Canadian Coast Guard.  The nine vessels were scheduled to be delivered by 2014–2015.

In October 2011 Irving Shipbuilding was deemed the successful proponent for constructing 23 warships for the Royal Canadian Navy under the $35 billion National Shipbuilding Procurement Strategy.  This merit-based competition will see the federal government enter into an exclusive contract with Irving Shipbuilding to supply the vessels over the next 20 years.

Scotia Dock II sunk in May 2010 while preparing to allow a tugboat to enter.  Although it was subsequently raised, it was determined to be damaged beyond repair, so it was sold for scrap in 2012.  The shipyard planned a replacement as part of its preparations for implementing the National Shipbuilding Procurement Strategy.

In 2013 Irving Shipbuilding started its $300-million modernization of the Halifax Shipyard to accommodate the building of vessels for the federal government.

Partial list of ships built 

 
  launched 1953
  launched 1956
 
  launched 1957
 
  launched 1963

 
  launched 1943
  launched 1944
  launched 1945
  launched 1945

 :
 , launched in 1996
 , launched in 1996
 , launched in 1997
 , launched in 1997
 , launched in 1997
 , launched in 1998
 , launched in 1998
 , launched in 1998
 , launched in 1998
 , launched in 1998
 , launched in 1999
 , launched in 1999
 Icebreakers
, launched in 1930
 Ferries:
 MV Confederation, Canadian National Railway and later by Northumberland Ferries Limited, launched in 1962 (scrapped 2007)
 Manco Capac, PeruRail rail car ferry at Lake Titicaca, built and knocked down in 1970, re-assembled at Lake Titicaca in 1971
 Petit Princess, Nova Scotia Dept. of Transport, launched in 2004

Cargo steamships
 , launched in 1920
 SS Canadian Explorer, launched in 1921
 SS Canadian Cruiser, refrigerated ship, launched in 1921
 , refrigerated ship, launched in 1922
Cargo/Passenger Steamships
Bahia Aguirre, launched in 1950
Bahia Buen Suceso, launched in 1950
Bahia Thetis, launched in 1950
 Cruise ships:
 Pearl Mist, launched in 2009 

Harbour tugs
Sambro/Erg launched in 1915
  launched in 1992
 Anchor handling tug supply vessels:
 Atlantic Eagle, launched in 1999
 Atlantic Hawk, launched in 2000
 Atlantic Kingfisher, launched in 2002
 Atlantic Osprey, launched in 2003
  Atlantic Condor, launched in 2010
 s
 , launched in 2012
 , launched in 2012
 CCGS Corporal Teather C.V., launched in 2012
 CCGS Constable Carrière, launched in 2013

Ships to be built 
 Arctic Patrol Ship Project, 6 vessels (see National Shipbuilding Procurement Strategy)
 Single Class Surface Combatant Project, 15 planned vessels (see National Shipbuilding Procurement Strategy)

Maintenance Contracts with RCN 

Halifax Shipyards is one of three shipyards being awarded contracts for maintenance and repair of the Halifax-class frigates. Along with Davie Shipbuilding, Halifax Shipyards will be assigned with the 6 frigates based on in Halifax with Victoria Shipyards handling those based in CFB Esquimalt.

References

External links

 Irving Shipbuilding Inc. (Halifax Shipyard)

Shipbuilding companies of Canada
Companies based in Halifax, Nova Scotia
Manufacturing companies established in 1889
1889 establishments in Nova Scotia
Drydocks